7 April Stadium is a football stadium in the Syrian city of Aleppo. Opened in 1948, the venue is considered to be the oldest football stadium in Syria. The stadium is home to the Syrian 2nd Division football clubs Al-Yarmouk SC, Jalaa SC, Shorta Aleppo SC and Ommal Aleppo SC.

History
The stadium was opened as the Aleppo Municipal Stadium in 1948 shortly-after the independence of Syria. In 1977, the stadium was enlarged and the seating capacity was increased to 12,000. In the same year, the stadium was renamed as 7 April Stadium to commemorate the 30th anniversary of the foundation of the Ba'ath Party. During the beginning of the 1980s, the natural grass of the stadium was replaced with a plastic pitch. Later in 2001, an artificial turf was installed.

The stadium has a nearby outdoor swimming pool and 2 outdoor tennis courts.

After the breakout of the Syrian Civil War, the stadium remained intact during the Battle of Aleppo between 2012 and 2016.

See also
List of football stadiums in Syria

References

Sports venues completed in 1948
1948 establishments in Syria
7 April Aleppo
Sports venues in Aleppo